The Bowling Green Hot Rods are a Minor League Baseball team of the South Atlantic League and the High-A affiliate of the Tampa Bay Rays. They are located in Bowling Green, Kentucky, and play their home games at Bowling Green Ballpark, which opened in 2009. The team is named for the city's connections to the automotive and racing industries such as the National Corvette Museum, Holley Carburetor, Beech Bend Raceway, and the Bowling Green Assembly Plant.

Founded in 2009, they were members of the Class A South Atlantic League in their inaugural season and played in the Class A Midwest League from 2010 to 2020. There were elevated to the High-A classification and placed in the High-A East in 2021, but this was renamed the South Atlantic League in 2022.

History
The Hot Rods began life as the Wilmington Waves, one of two South Atlantic League expansion teams for the 2001 season.  However, the Waves' stay at Brooks Field in Wilmington, North Carolina, lasted but a single season. They became the South Georgia Waves when the team was moved to the Paul Eames Sports Complex in Albany, Georgia, for the 2002 season. The team retained the moniker name when it again moved to Golden Park in Columbus, Georgia, just before the 2003 campaign. One year later, in 2004, the franchise changed names and became the Columbus Catfish.

In April 2008, ownership moved the team to Bowling Green effective for the 2009 season under the new nickname "Hot Rods." Their first manager as the Hot Rods was Matt Quatraro.

In 2010, the Hot Rods and the Lake County Captains moved from the South Atlantic League to the Midwest League, a plan meant to alleviate travel expenses associated with routine road trips as well as player movement within the teams' respective organizations.

In December 2013, Art Solomon, owner of the Hot Rods for five years, sold the team to Manhattan Capital Sports headed by Stuart Katzoff.
The Hot Rods have been widely recognized for their promotional efforts. In 2009, the team's "What Could've Been Night" was named Promotion of the Year by MiLB.com. In 2010, Hot Rods Assistant General Manager Greg Coleman was honored as Marketer of the Year by the Professional Marketing Association.

In September 2018, the team was sold to Jack Blackstock who had previously been a minority investor in the team.

That year, the Hot Rods won 90 games and captured their first ever Midwest League title, under then manager Craig Albernaz.

Along with Major League Baseball's reorganization of the minors after the 2020 season, the Hot Rods were invited to remain a Tampa Bay affiliate but be elevated to High-A in 2021 as members of the High-A East.  They won the Southern Division title by ending the season with a first-place 82–36 record. They then won the High-A East championship by defeating the Greensboro Grasshoppers, 3–2, in a best-of-five series. Jeff Smith won the league's Manager of the Year Award. In 2022, the High-A East became known as the South Atlantic League, the name historically used by the regional circuit prior to the 2021 reorganization.

Season records

Playoffs

Bowling Green Ballpark

Address: 300 E 8th Ave, Bowling Green, KY 42101
Opened: April 17, 2009
Seating capacity: 4,559
Dimensions: LF – 318 ft, CF – 400 ft, RF – 326 ft

Bowling Green Ballpark was designed by architectural firm DLR Group. The right-centerfield wall in Bowling Green Ballpark is unique in that it is concave in right-center because of the shape of a pre-existing road behind the field. The scoreboard in right-centerfield measures 35-feet tall and 56-feet wide, with the ability to show scoring, live video, advertisements, player statistics, and more. Embedded in the left field wall is a 6-foot, 3inch tall by 68-foot wide LED display board, behind which is a picnic area. There are two grass lawn seating areas- one in left-center and one at the right field line. The kids play area boasts an inflatable car customized with the Hot Rods' logo, a carousel, and a playground, and a behind the batter's eye in centerfield, a splash-pad. The Performance Food Service Club is a bar located on suite level directly behind home plate. Also on the suite level are 10 suites, the Hall of Fame suite, and a party deck—The Coca-Cola Deck.

Media coverage
In addition to internet streaming coverage on MILB.tv, the Hot Rods are broadcast locally on radio station WKCT AM 930 and translator  W281BV (104.1 FM) since 2022. WBGN was the original flagship station of Hot Rods baseball for the team's first 12 years in Bowling Green from 2009 to 2021.

Mascots

One of the Hot Rods' mascots is an anthropomorphic bear named Axle. Debuting in 2009, he wears an orange Hot Rods uniform, number 00. The Hot Rods' furry, fun-loving bear has captivated crowds at Bowling Green Ballpark while making good on his promise to become a true community ambassador. Roscoe is the Hot Rods' second mascot, debuting during the 2010 season. He is a Grease Monkey who wears a navy Hot Rods jersey.

Turbo is a Golden Retriever who was adopted into the Hot Rods family on December 13, 2019. He is currently training to become a "batdog", retrieving bats and balls and returning them to the Hot Rods' dugout, as well as delivering balls to the home plate umpire, for the 2021 season. Turbo is one of a few bat dogs in Minor League Baseball.

Roster

Alumni

The following are players in Major League Baseball who played, at one time, for the Hot Rods. Players are listed under the team they debuted for.

Tampa Bay Rays
 Matt Moore
 Alex Colome
 Tim Beckham
 Enny Romero
 Kevin Kiermaier
 CJ Riefenhauser
 Kirby Yates
 Ryan Brett
 Andrew Bellatti
 Luke Maile
 Blake Snell
 Taylor Motter
 Ryan Garton
 Dylan Floro
 Juniel Querecuto
 Austin Pruitt
 Jose Alvarado
 Ryne Stanek
 Hunter Wood
 Jacob Faria
 Yonny Chirinos
 Johnny Field
 Willy Adames
 Jaime Schultz
 Diego Castillo
 Justin Williams
 Brandon Lowe
 Nick Ciuffo
 Nate Lowe
 Michael Brosseau
 Brendan McKay
 Ian Gibaut
 Kean Wong
 Josh Fleming
 Shane McClanahan
 Kevin Padlo
 Brent Honeywell Jr.
 Taylor Walls
 Wander Franco
 Vidal Brujan
 Joshua Lowe
 Shane Baz

San Francisco Giants
 Albert Suarez
 Roberto Gomez
 Enderson Franco
 Joe McCarthy
 Sam Long

Arizona Diamondbacks
 Oscar Hernandez
 Merrill Kelly

Detroit Tigers
 Kyle Lobstein
 Ryan Carpenter

Los Angeles Angels
 Luis Rengifo
 Matt Ramsey

Texas Rangers
 Kyle Bird
 Brock Burke

Miami Marlins
 Derek Dietrich
 Jesús Sánchez
 Paul Campbell

St. Louis Cardinals
 Genesis Cabrera
 Roel Ramirez

Kansas City Royals
 Wilking Rodriguez

San Diego Padres
 Chris Rearick
 Jake Cronenworth

Washington Nationals
 Felipe Vazquez

Baltimore Orioles
 Joey Rickard

Philadelphia Phillies
 Tyler Goeddel
 Cristopher Sanchez

Los Angeles Dodgers
 Andrew Toles

Colorado Rockies
 German Marquez

Toronto Blue Jays
 Taylor Guerrieri

Seattle Mariners
 Parker Markel

Oakland Athletics
 Jonah Heim

Minnesota Twins
 Joe Ryan

Cincinnati Reds
 Riley O'Brien

New York Mets
Jake Hager

References

External links
Official website

Baseball teams established in 2009
Midwest League teams
South Atlantic League teams
Sports in Bowling Green, Kentucky
Professional baseball teams in Kentucky
Tampa Bay Rays minor league affiliates
2009 establishments in Kentucky
High-A East teams